Austre Memurutinden is a mountain in Lom Municipality in Innlandet county, Norway. It is the 21st tallest peak in Norway.

The mountain is surrounded by several other notable mountains including Veotinden and Styggehøbretindan to the northeast; Blåbreahøe and Surtningssue to the southeast; Reinstinden to the south; Hinnotefjellet, Søre Hellstugutinden, Nestsøre Hellstugutinden, and Store Hellstugutinden to the southwest; Midtre Hellstugutinden, Nørdre Hellstugutinden, and Store Memurutinden to the west; and Veobretinden, Veobreahesten, and Leirhøi to the northeast.

See also
List of mountains of Norway by height

References

Jotunheimen
Lom, Norway
Mountains of Innlandet